TVN Fabula is a Polish TV channel launched April 16, 2015.

The channel assigns series of TVN Group, movie trailers, foreign series and own productions. It also broadcasts programs on culture, showbiz and talk show with actors. The channel is broadcast in HDTV (1080i). The viewer has the option to watch movies with a Polish voice over or with original soundtrack and Polish subtitles.

The station broadcasts daily binge-watching series, meaning several episodes of one series in a row.

History
The channel started airing April 16, 2015 at 9 pm. The first movie shown was The Lord of the Rings: The Return of the King.

References

External links
 

TVN (Polish TV channel)
Television channels in Poland
Television channels and stations established in 2015
2015 establishments in Poland
Polish-language television stations
Mass media in Warsaw